Defiance is an American science fiction television series developed for television by Rockne S. O'Bannon, Kevin Murphy, and Michael Taylor. The series was produced by Universal Cable Productions, in transmedia collaboration with Trion Worlds, who produced an MMORPG video game of the same name that tied into the series.

Defiance was renewed for a 13-episode third season on September 25, 2014, which premiered on June 12, 2015. On October 16, 2015, the show was cancelled by Syfy after three seasons.

Series overview

Episodes

Season 1 (2013)

Season 2 (2014)

Season 3 (2015)

Minisodes

Defiance: The Lost Ones
A five-part series of minisodes titled Defiance: The Lost Ones were released on March 28, 2014 on Syfy.com. The minisodes are each approximately 5 minutes long and they connect the first and second seasons while Nolan (Grant Bowler) searches for Irisa (Stephanie Leonidas).

References

External links 

Defiance
 
Defiance (TV series)